The 2021–22 WABA League is the 21st season of the Adriatic League. Competition included twelve teams from seven countries. In this season participating clubs from Serbia, Montenegro, Bosnia and Herzegovina, Bulgaria, Croatia, North Macedonia and Slovenia.

Reigning WABA champion Beroe Stara Zagora (Bulgaria) have withdrawn from the 2021–22 WABA League.

25 September 2021 Feniks Pale (Bosnia and Herzegovina) has withdraws from the 2021-22 WABA League. As per the Official Basketball Rules, all games were awarded to their respective opponents with a score of 20-0. Furthermore, the forfeiting team Feniks will receive 0 classification points in the standings.

Teams

Team allocation

Venues and locations

Regular season
In the Regular season was played with 12 teams divided into 2 groups of 6 teams and play a dual circuit system, each with one game each at home and away. The four best teams in each group at the end of the regular season were placed in the SuperLeague. The regular season began on 29 September 2021 and it will end on 21 December 2021.

Group A

Group B

SuperLeague

In the SuperLeague was played with 8 teams and play a dual circuit system, each with one game each at home and away. The four best teams in SuperLeague at the end of the last round were placed on the Final Four. The SuperLeague began on 5 January 2022 and it will end on 15 March 2022.

Classification 9–12

Classification 9–12 of the WABA League took place between 3 March 2022 and it will end on 16 March 2022.

Feniks Pale has withdrawn from the 2021–22 WABA League. As per the Official Basketball Rules, all games were awarded to their respective opponents with a score of 20-0. Furthermore, the forfeiting team Feniks will receive 0 classification points in the standings.

Ninth place game

Eleventh place game

Final Four

Final Four was held on 19–20 March 2022 in Podgorica, Montenegro.

Awards
Final Four MVP: Isabela Lyra (180-F-1994) of  Cinkarna Celje
Player of the Year: La mama Kapinga Maweja (194-F/C-1997) of  Plamen Požega
Guard of the Year: Dragana Živković (183-SG-2001) of  Budućnost Bemax
Forward of Year: Isabela Lyra (180-F-1994) of  Cinkarna Celje
Center of the Year: La mama Kapinga Maweja (194-F/C-1997) of  Plamen Požega
Newcomer of the Year: Jovana Boričić (179-SF-2003) of  Partizan 1953
Most Improved Player of Year: Maruša Seničar (187-SF-1997) of  Cinkarna Celje
Defensive Player of Year: Maruša Seničar (187-SF-1997) of  Cinkarna Celje
Coach of the Year: Damir Grgić of  Cinkarna Celje

1st Team
 Santa Okockyte-Balkojiene (175-G-1992) of  Montana 2003
 Dragana Živković (183-SG-2001) of  Budućnost Bemax
 Isabela Lyra (180-F-1994) of  Cinkarna Celje
 Mina Đorđević (188-PF-1999) of  Budućnost Bemax
 La mama Kapinga Maweja (194-F/C-1997) of  Plamen Požega

2nd Team
 Marija Leković (166-PG-2003) of  Budućnost Bemax
 Tamara Rajić (182-G/F-1993) of  Orlovi
 Jelena Ivezić (183-F-1984) of  Plamen Požega
 Maruša Seničar (187-SF-1997) of  Cinkarna Celje
 Sara Loomis (188-PF-1997) of  Vojvodina 021

All-Defensive Team
 Mojca Jelenc (200-C-2003) of  Cinkarna Celje
 Barbara Georgieva (188-C-1998) of  Montana 2003
 Vladinka Erak (192-C-1984) of  Orlovi
 Lara Bubnič (190-C-1999) of  Cinkarna Celje
 Ivana Kmetovska (190-C-1995) of  Badel 1862

All-Newcomers Team
 Marija Leković (166-PG-2003) of  Budućnost Bemax
 Marina Davinić (173-SG-2003) of  Partizan 1953
 Manca Vrečer (178-SG-2002) of  Triglav Kranj
 Jovana Boričić (179-SF-2003) of  Partizan 1953
 Gala Kramžar (180-PG-1999)  Triglav Kranj

See also
 2021–22 ABA League First Division
 2021–22 First Women's Basketball League of Serbia

References

External links
 Official website
 Profile at eurobasket.com

 
2021-22
2021–22 in European women's basketball leagues
2021–22 in Serbian basketball
2021–22 in Bosnia and Herzegovina basketball
2021–22 in Croatian basketball
2021–22 in Montenegrin basketball
2021–22 in Slovenian basketball
2021–22 in Bulgarian basketball
2021–22 in North Macedonia basketball